Calyculins are natural products originally isolated from the marine sponge Discodermia calyx. Calyculins have proven to be strong serine/threonine protein phosphatase inhibitors and based on this property, calyculins might be potential tumor-promoting agents.

References 

Organophosphates
Nitriles
Spiro compounds